The Lindi is a minor river of northeastern Democratic Republic of the Congo. It flows through North Kivu and Tshopo provinces, and empties into the Congo River just west of Kisangani.

Settlements

Asangwa
Bafwasende (N4 road bridge)
Yasangani (N4 road bridge)

Tshopo
Rivers of the Democratic Republic of the Congo